The 2017–18 Slovak Extraliga season was the 25th season of the Slovak Extraliga, the highest level of ice hockey in Slovakia.

Teams
The following teams are participating in the 2017–18 season. HK Orange 20 is a project to prepare the Slovakia junior ice hockey team for the IIHF World U20 Championship. The team does not play a complete regular season and cannot advance to the playoffs or get relegated. The first eight teams in standings after the regular season (56 games) will advance to the playoffs.

Regular season

Rules for classification: 1) Points; 2) Head-to-head points.

Relegation series (PlayOut)

Rules for classification: 1) Points; 2) Head-to-head points.

Playoffs

Bracket

Quarterfinals

Semifinals

Finals 

Banská Bystrica wins the series 4-3 and wins the championship.

Final rankings

External links
Official website

Slovak Extraliga seasons
Slovak
2017–18 in Slovak ice hockey leagues